The Emmy Award for Outstanding Host or Commentator was awarded from 1968 to 1992. It was awarded to a sports broadcaster who was best at hosting an event from a studio or commentating on an event as it was taking place. In 1981, the category's name was given a slight change to Outstanding Host or Play-by-Play. That change is reflected in this article.

Awards like these are now given away at the Sports Emmy Awards.

List of winners

Outstanding Host or Commentator
1967-68: Jim McKay (ABC)
1968-69: no award was given
1969-70: no award was given
1970-71: a tie between Jim McKay (ABC) and Don Meredith (ABC)
1971-72: no award was given
1972-73: Jim McKay (ABC)
1973-74: Jim McKay (ABC)
1974-75: Jim McKay (ABC)
1975-76: Jim McKay (ABC)
1976-77: Frank Gifford (ABC)
1977-78: Jack Whitaker (CBS)
1978-79: Jim McKay (ABC)
1979-80: Jim McKay (ABC)

Outstanding Host or Play-by-Play
1980-81: Dick Enberg (NBC)
1981-82: Jim McKay (ABC)
1982-83: Dick Enberg (NBC)
1983-84: no award was given
1984-85: George Michael (NBC)
1985-86: no award was given
1986-87: Al Michaels (ABC)
1987-88: Bob Costas (NBC)
1988: Bob Costas (NBC)
1989: Al Michaels (ABC)
1990: Dick Enberg (NBC)
1991: Bob Costas (NBC)
1992: Bob Costas (NBC)

Multiple wins
9 wins
Jim McKay

4 wins
Bob Costas

3 wins
Dick Enberg

2 wins
Al Michaels

Host or Commentator